David Sala (born 24 August 2004) is a Romanian professional footballer who plays as a defensive midfielder  for CS Universitatea Craiova.

Club career

Universitatea Craiova
While a junior at Coltea Brasov in 2020, Sala traveled to Spain club Celta de Vigo for a trial.  He made his Liga I debut for Universitatea Craiova against Farul Constanța on 20 May 2022.

Career statistics

Club

References

External links
 
 

2004 births
Living people
Sportspeople from Brașov
Romanian footballers
Romania youth international footballers
Association football forwards
Liga I players
CS Universitatea Craiova players